Neil John Pearson (born 27 April 1959) is a British actor, known for his work on television. He was nominated for the 1994 BAFTA TV Award for Best Actor for Between the Lines (1992–1994). His other television roles include Drop the Dead Donkey (1990–1998), All the Small Things (2009), Waterloo Road (2014–2015), and In the Club (2014–2016). His film appearances include all three of the Bridget Jones films. He is also an antiquarian book dealer who specialises in the expatriate literary movement of Paris between the World Wars.

Early life
Pearson grew up in Battersea and Balham, London. His father, a panel beater, left home when he was five; his mother was a legal secretary. He was a boarder at Woolverstone Hall School near Ipswich, Suffolk, where he first learned to act. He attended the Central School of Speech and Drama from 1977 to 1980.

Stage, television and film work
One of Pearson's early appearances was in 1984 alongside Leonard Rossiter in Joe Orton's play Loot at the Lyric Theatre in London; Rossiter died in his dressing-room during a later performance. He won a part in Hat Trick Productions' sitcom Chelmsford 123 and also appeared with Hat Trick executive Jimmy Mulville in That's Love. Pearson narrated Colin Wyatt's animated series The Poddington Peas in 1986.

It was in the roles of associate editor and office lothario and gambling addict, Dave Charnley, in the sitcom Drop the Dead Donkey - another Hat Trick show -  and of Detective Superintendent Tony Clark in the thriller Between the Lines (1992–94), that he made his greatest impact on the viewing public.

Since then he has appeared in such varied roles as Dr Jameson in Rhodes (1998), Jack Green in the children's serial The Magician's House (1999), Trevor Heslop in Trevor's World of Sport (2003) and John Diamond in A Lump in My Throat (2003). He has also been in several films, including The Secret Rapture (1993), Fever Pitch (1997) and Bridget Jones's Diary (2001). He played Major Steve Arnold, the American interrogator, in Taking Sides at the Yvonne Arnaud Theatre in 2003. He played Rob in The Booze Cruise (2003), and then also in the second and third sequels in 2005 and 2006. He appeared in the 2006 Radio Four series Vent as Ben. He played the choirmaster Michael Caddick in the BBC drama All the Small Things in 2009. He also appeared in episodes of Midsomer Murders and Lewis - in the former, appearing alongside Drop the Dead Donkey co-star Jeff Rawle; and in the latter, again playing a gambling addict alongside Haydn Gwynne, another star of Drop the Dead Donkey - and played Doug Anderson in an episode of Death in Paradise in 2013.

In the Inspector George Gently episode Goodbye to China (2011), Pearson acts as a former Sergeant of DCI Gently, who now has risen in rank above his former master. In 2014 Pearson became a series regular in Waterloo Road as new headteacher Vaughan Fitzgerald.

Pearson was a judge on Channel 4's The Play's the Thing, which sought to find a play written by an unknown writer for a run in the West End. The winning play, written by Kate Betts, was called On the Third Day and opened at the New Ambassadors Theatre in London in June 2006. Pearson appeared in a touring revival of Sir Peter Hall's production of Harold Pinter's Old Times in 2006, and in a production of Tom Stoppard's play Arcadia at the Duke of York's Theatre, London, in 2009.

After obtaining a collection of original Hancock's Half Hour radio scripts and realising that some of the corresponding recordings no longer existed, he conceived and subsequently co-produced The Missing Hancocks, a series of re-creations of selected wiped episodes for BBC Radio 4, which debuted in October 2014.

In 2020 he was in season 8, episode 4 of Father Brown.

Pearson has acted in several BBC Radio Dramas including the black comedy series Vent as comatose writer Ben Smith, adaptations of the Martin Beck novels playing Beck's sidekick Detective Lennart Kollberg, and House of Ghosts: A Case for Inspector Morse where he played the late Colin Dexter's iconic fictional detective Inspector Morse.

Antiquarian book business

Pearson is the author of a book on the publisher Jack Kahane, Obelisk: A History of Jack Kahane and the Obelisk Press. He is a collector of rare drama scripts and in 2011 he opened an online bookshop specialising in theatrical material. He has a special interest in the expatriate literary movement of Paris between the wars.

Personal interests

He strongly identifies with the British Left - having made a party election broadcast for the Labour Party for the 1994 European Elections, though he later supported Ken Livingstone when Livingstone ran as an independent candidate for Mayor of London in 2000.  For many years he has also supported the National Council for One Parent Families, having written about his family background for the organisation, and also raised £32,000 for the charity on a celebrity edition of Who Wants to Be a Millionaire?.

He is a keen Texas hold 'em poker player and participated in the 2007 World Series of Poker Europe event in London. Pearson is also a fan of Tottenham Hotspur and regularly attends home games. In 2007 he assisted with fundraising to renovate the Bristol Old Vic Theatre.

References

External links
BBC Radio Gloucestershire interview with Neil 03/07

1959 births
Male actors from London
Alumni of the Royal Central School of Speech and Drama
English male stage actors
English male television actors
People from Battersea
Living people